Gate City can mean:
 Gate City, Virginia, a city in Scott County, Virginia
 Gate City Historic District, a national historic district located at Gate City, Scott County, Virginia
 Gate City, a park in Ōsaki, Tokyo
 Gate City, a newly developed ring city near Almaty, Kazakhstan
Gate City Bank, mutually owned bank headquartered in Fargo, North Dakota,
Gate City FC, an earlier American soccer club based in Greensboro, North Carolina

City nicknames
 the nickname of Pocatello, Idaho
 the nickname of Nashua, New Hampshire
 the nickname of Greensboro, North Carolina
 a historic nickname for Atlanta, Georgia

See also
City Gate (disambiguation)